Libočany is a municipality and village in Louny District in the Ústí nad Labem Region of the Czech Republic. It has about 500 inhabitants. It is known as the birthplace of Wenceslaus Hajek, the most renowned Czech chronicler.

Geography
It lies in an agricultural landscape of the Most Basin. The municipality is situated on the right bank of the Ohře River. The Liboc River flows through the village, its confluence with the Ohře is located just beyond the municipal border.

History

The first written mention of Libočany is from 1226, when it was a property of the Premonstratensian monastery in Doksany. In 1770, Václav Karel Schroll of Schrollenberg built a new château on the site of an older stronghold with a new Baroque church and rectory in Rococo style.

Before 1918 Libočany was part of the Bohemian part of the Austrian Empire. In 1919 it became part of the newly independent Czechoslovakia. In 1938, along with the Sudetenland, it was annexed by Nazi Germany after the Munich Agreement. In 1945 it was restored to Czechoslovakia and most of its German speaking inhabitants were expelled.

Beer

The brewery from the 19th century produced beer even for US trade with a stock in New York. The Liebotschaner Beer was among four Bohemian beer brands exported to the USA (the others were Pilsner Urquell, Budweiser Bier, and Michelob). The latter place, as well as Liebotschan, are located in the Saaz hops region. Several local American breweries have produced beer under the name of the village, or abbreviated to Lieb (e.g. Chattanooga Brewing Co. in Tennessee, Stegmaier Brewing Company, or Lion Brewery, Inc., Wilkes-Barre in Pennsylvania; Genesee's Liebotschaner Beer was pronounced best of Rochester's post repeal brews in 1932.

The production of beer in Libočany ended after World War I when the Austrian-Hungarian Empire was dissolved and Czechoslovak authorities took over. The buildings of the brewery were demolished in 1939 (during the era of German occupation of Czech lands). After World War II, in socialist Czechoslovakia, it was replaced by a collective farm.

Notable people
Wenceslaus Hajek (?–1553), chronicler
Božena Viková-Kunětická (1862–1934), politician, writer, and feminist; lived here in 1921–1934

References

External links

Villages in Louny District